Golarcheh-ye Sofla (also Romanized as Golārcheh-ye Soflá; also known as Golārcheh-ye Pā’īn) is a village in Jannatabad Rural District, Salehabad County, Razavi Khorasan Province, Iran. At the 2006 census, its population was 207, in 44 families.

References 

Populated places in   Torbat-e Jam County